The Southern Outlet is a major highway in the Tasmanian capital of Hobart and acts as one of the city's 3 major radial highways, connecting traffic from the Hobart city centre with commuters from the southern suburbs as well as intrastate traffic from the south of the state. It is one of the busier commuter highways in Hobart, handling in excess of 31,000 traffic movements each day.

Route
The Southern Outlet starts at an intersection with the Davey/Macquarie couplet in Hobart, with a maximum speed limit of 80 km/h. The highway bypasses South Hobart and heads south into the mountainous terrain of Mount Nelson. Except for the Davey/Macquarie intersection the highway is fully grade separated and travels through bushland for the majority of its length. The northbound and southbound lanes are separated between Tolmans Hill overpass through to the Firthside overpass because of the mountainous landscape, allowing a higher maximum speed limit of 100 km/h. The Highway ends in Kingston, at the Kingston Interchange.

History
The Hobart Transportation Study 1965 indicated the need for a transport corridor from Hobart to Kingston. The Southern Outlet was opened in 1969 as a super-2 expressway and went from Kingston to meet up with the old Huon Highway at Grove. It opened as a fully dual-carriage way highway in 1990

Exits

See also

 List of Highways in Hobart

References

External links

Highways in Australia
Highways in Hobart